is a district of Chūō Ward in Kobe, Japan. It is located between Mount Rokkō and the port of Kobe.

It is located adjacent to Nankinmachi (南京町: Kobe Chinatown) and Kyū-kyoryūchi (旧居留地: a foreign settlement in the 19th century: there are several buildings from that time, now used as restaurants or coffee shops.). Daimaru department store and several boutiques (BVLGARI, Giorgio Armani, Dunhill, etc.) are in Motomachi, as well as a mile-long covered shopping street.

There were many trading companies in Motomachi in the 19th century.

It is also well known in Japan for its cosmopolitan atmosphere, and foreign influence, similar to the Motomachi area in Yokohama, Ginza in Tokyo and Shinsaibashi in Osaka.

Transportation 
Motomachi Station serves the JR Kobe Line, the Hanshin Main Line and the Kobe Rapid Transit Railway Tōzai Line.

Shopping districts and streets in Japan
Tourist attractions in Kobe
Geography of Kobe
All articles lacking sources